Voi meitä! Anoppi tulee  (AKAThe Mother-in-Law Cometh) is a 1933 Finnish comedy film directed by Erkki Karu and starring Mia Backman, Uuno Laakso and Georg Malmstén. It was based on a popular stage farce My Wife's Family by Fred Duprez.

There were three British film versions of the play, in 1931, 1941, and 1956. It had also been filmed previously in Sweden in 1932, and it was the popularity of this which led to the Finnish version being made.

References

1933 films
1933 comedy films
1930s Finnish-language films
Finnish comedy films
Finnish black-and-white films
Finnish films based on plays
Remakes of British films